Buy is the debut studio album by American no wave band Contortions. It was released in 1979 through ZE Records following the band's inclusion on the 1978 compilation No New York.

Critical reception

For The Village Voice, critic Robert Christgau stated that "in theory James White's music is better without the words: you get the jagged rhythms and tonic off-harmonies without being distracted by his 'ideas,'" but added that "in fact the music is so (deliberately) stunted it needs a voice for sonic muscle, and James's lyrics do have a certain petty honesty and jerk-off humor."

All About Jazz critic Trevor MacLaren wrote that "through the anger and aggression Chance made a solid record that had a sound like nothing before or since," describing the album as "a great disc that sounds as original and cutting edge as when it was released." Dean McFarlane of AllMusic stated that Chance "never quite topped the warped distillation of punk, funk, and free jazz presented here, making Buy a pivotal recording of the New York post-punk era."

Track listing

Personnel
 James Chance – vocals, alto saxophone, keyboards
 David Hofstra– bass
 Don Christensen – drums
 Jody Harris – guitar
 Pat Place – slide guitar
 George Scott III – bass (tracks: 10 to 12)
 Adele Bertei – Acetone organ (tracks: 10 to 12)

References

External links
 James Chance official website

James Chance albums
1979 debut albums
Punk jazz albums
ZE Records albums